Portland, Oregon is divided into six sections: North Portland, Northeast Portland, Northwest Portland, South Portland, Southeast Portland, and Southwest Portland. There are 95 officially recognized neighborhoods, each of which is represented by a volunteer-based neighborhood association. No neighborhood associations overlap the Willamette River, but a few overlap the addressing sextants.  For example, most addresses in the South Portland Neighborhood Association are South, but a portion of the neighborhood is west of SW View Point Terrace where addresses have a SW prefix.  Similarly the Buckman Neighborhood Association spans both NE and SE Portland.

Neighborhood associations serve as the liaison between residents and the city government, as coordinated by the city's Office of Community & Civic Life, which was created in 1974 and known as the Office of Neighborhood Involvement until July 2018. The city subsequently provides funding to this "network of neighborhoods" through district coalitions, which are groupings of neighborhood associations.  A few areas of Portland are "unclaimed" by any of the 95 neighborhood associations in Portland.

Neighborhoods
Each neighborhood association defines its own boundaries, which may include areas outside of Portland city limits and (if mutually agreed) areas that overlap with other neighborhoods.  Neighborhoods may span boundaries between the six sections (North Portland, Northeast Portland, Northwest Portland, South Portland, Southeast Portland, and Southwest Portland) of the city as well.  The segmentation adopted here is based on Office of Community & Civic Life's district coalition model, under which each neighborhood is part of at most one coalition (though some neighborhoods are not included in any).

Neighbors West-Northwest 
Neighborhoods in the Neighbors West-Northwest Coalition (NWNW) include:

Arlington Heights
Forest Park
Goose Hollow
Hillside
Linnton
Northwest District (includes Uptown, Nob Hill, Alphabet Historic District)
Northwest Heights
Northwest Industrial
Old Town Chinatown
Pearl District
Portland Downtown
Sylvan-Highlands

These are in Northwest Portland, except Arlington Heights, Goose Hollow, Portland Downtown, and Sylvan-Highlands, which are in Southwest Portland.

Southwest Neighborhoods, Inc.
The following neighborhoods, all of which are within the boundaries of Southwest Portland, are associated with Southwest Neighborhoods, Inc. (SWNI):

Arnold Creek
Ashcreek
Bridlemile (includes Glencullen)
Collins View
Crestwood
Far Southwest
Hayhurst (includes Vermont Hills)
Hillsdale
Homestead
Maplewood
Markham
Marshall Park
Multnomah (includes Multnomah Village)
South Burlingame
South Portland (includes Corbett, Fulton, Lair Hill, Terwilliger, and the Johns Landing and South Waterfront developments)
Southwest Hills, Portland, Oregon
West Portland Park (includes Capitol Hill)

North Portland Neighborhood Services
Neighborhoods associated with the North Portland Neighborhood Services (NPNS) include:

Arbor Lodge
Bridgeton
Cathedral Park
East Columbia
Hayden Island
Kenton 
Overlook
Piedmont
Portsmouth
St. Johns
University Park

Most lie entirely within North Portland.  Bridgeton, Hayden Island and Piedmont are split between North and Northeast sections.  East Columbia is in Northeast Portland.

Northeast Coalition of Neighborhoods
Neighborhoods associated with the Northeast Coalition of Neighborhoods (NECN) include:

Alameda
Boise
Concordia
Eliot
Humboldt
Irvington
King
Lloyd District
Sabin
Sullivan's Gulch
Vernon
Woodlawn

Most lie entirely within Northeast Portland.  Boise, Eliot, and Humboldt include areas in North Portland.

Central Northeast Neighbors
The following neighborhoods, all of which are within the boundaries of Northeast Portland, are associated with the Central Northeast Neighbors (CNN):

Beaumont-Wilshire
Cully
Grant Park
Hollywood
Madison South
Rose City Park
Roseway
Sumner
Sunderland (includes the Dignity Village homeless encampment)

East Portland Community Office
Neighborhoods associated with the East Portland Community Office include:

Argay
Centennial
Glenfair
Hazelwood
Lents
Mill Park
Parkrose
Parkrose Heights
Pleasant Valley
Powellhurst-Gilbert
Russell
Wilkes
Woodland Park

Argay, Parkrose, Parkrose Heights, Russell, Wilkes, and Woodland Park are in Northeast Portland.
Glenfair and Hazelwood are split between Northeast and Southeast sections.
Centennial, Lents, Mill Park, Pleasant Valley, and Powellhurst-Gilbert are in Southeast Portland.

Southeast Uplift Neighborhood Coalition (SE Uplift)
The following neighborhoods are associated with the Southeast Uplift Neighborhood Coaliation (SE Uplift):

Ardenwald-Johnson Creek
Brentwood-Darlington
Brooklyn
Buckman
Creston-Kenilworth
Eastmoreland
Foster-Powell
Hosford-Abernethy (includes Ladd's Addition)
Kerns
Laurelhurst
Montavilla
Mt. Scott-Arleta
Mt. Tabor
North Tabor
Reed (included Lambert Gardens)
Richmond
Sellwood-Moreland
South Tabor
Sunnyside
Woodstock

All are entirely within Southeast Portland, except North Tabor, Laurelhurst, Kerns, and Montavilla, which are split between Northeast and Southeast sections and Ardenwald-Johnson Creek, which covers both Portland and Milwaukie.

Unaffiliated with a coalition
Healy Heights

Healy Heights lies within Southwest Portland.

Other areas and communities
Alberta Arts District, an art, retail, and restaurant area in the King, Vernon, and Concordia neighborhoods
Albina, a historical city which was consolidated into Portland in 1891
The Belmont Area, a retail and residential area in the Buckman, Sunnyside, and Mt. Tabor neighborhoods
Dunthorpe, an affluent unincorporated enclave just beyond the city limits, north of Lake Oswego
Unincorporated areas near Portland proper in Washington County (unincorporated neighborhoods expanding into Washington County)
Bethany
Cedar Hills
Cedar Mill
Garden Home
Metzger
Oak Hills
Raleigh Hills
Rock Creek
West Haven-Sylvan
West Slope
East Portland, a historical city which was consolidated into Portland in 1891, not to be confused with the area of the same name that extends roughly east of I-205 to Portland's eastern boundary
East Portland, the area of Portland generally east of I-205, where approximately one quarter of residents reside, but which has historically not received adequate city services.
The Hawthorne District, a retail, restaurant, and cultural district running through the Buckman, Hosford-Abernethy, Sunnyside, Richmond, and Mt. Tabor neighborhoods
Maywood Park, a Northeast neighborhood incorporated as a separate city that is now completely surrounded by the city of Portland
Peacock Lane, a quaint English village in the heart of Sunnyside Neighborhood has been treating the city of Portland to free holiday lighting displays each December since the 1940s
Vanport, a city located in present-day North Portland destroyed by a flood in 1948

References

External links

Office of Community & Civic Life
PortlandNeighborhood.com - includes neighborhood guides and a clickable map
PortlandMaps.com - city's public GIS database, including demographic and other statistics on the neighborhoods, as well as official boundaries
Map of Neighborhood Associations and Coalitions, Small
Map of Neighborhood Associations and Coalitions, Large
List of individual neighborhood maps
Study of Portland Neighborhood Associations: Neighborhood Association Survey Results (League of Women Voters of Portland, June 2006)

Portland